Theodoros I may refer to:

 Patriarch Theodore I of Alexandria, Greek Patriarch of Alexandria in 607–609
 Theodore I of Constantinople, Ecumenical Patriarch in 677–679
 Pope Theodoros I of Alexandria, ruled in 730–742
 Theodore I Laskaris, Emperor of Nicaea in 1204–1221 or 1205–1222